Lírio Mário da Costa (Rio de Janeiro, 24 March 1923 — Rio de Janeiro, 15 September 1995), better known as Costinha, was a Brazilian comedian and actor.

Biography 
Born in the neighborhood of Vila Isabel, in the city of Rio de Janeiro, then federal capital of Brazil, Costinha came from an artistic family: his father was a circus clown, called Bocó, whom he would meet only as an adult when his father was in an retirement home. The childhood in circus would influence the trajectory of the comedian in a definitive way. However, the stable situation of the family changed when he turned thirteen, and his father left. Being still a minor, even though he had learned some secrets of the clown business from his father, Costinha had to give up his artistic vocation and find a job. He worked as a courier, botequim's waiter, shoeshiner, and Jogo do Bicho announcer. This conviviality alongside urban and often marginal Rio de Janeiro people of the 1940s would be very important in the characters later portrayed by the comedian.

In 1942, he was employed as a janitor of Rádio Tamoio. In this radio station, after amusing his co-workers making imitations of homosexuals, he was given a chance to act, being a radio actor in important programs of the time like Cadeira de Barbeiro, Recruta 23, and even in the first radio version of Escolinha do Professor Raimundo. He was part of the cast of major radio stations such as Record and Rádio Mayrink Veiga. He was also a comedian at the Teatro de Revista, both in São Paulo and Rio de Janeiro.

Then he would become a national star by his obscene jokes and famous "faggot" imitations. Costinha participated in several advertisements, including those of the Lottery of the State of Rio de Janeiro (where he came to be directed by Cacá Diegues from the Cinema Novo). He released various humor vinyl records in the 1970s and 1980s, like O Peru da Festa trilogy with the CID Entertainment label. They all came with a painted border with the sentence "Prohibited the public execution and sale for those under 21 years old", not only for the obscene jokes, but for the suggestive covers. In the first volume of O Peru da Festa, Costinha seemed to be naked, with a table covering his private parts and a roasted turkey being served over it.

At the movies, his participation has been intense since the 1950s. He began by participating in films like Agüenta Firme, Izidoro, a comedy; Anjo do Lôdo, an adaptation of the book Lucíola written by José de Alencar; and O Rei do Samba, biography of the legendary samba composer Sinhô. He played secondary roles and cameos in chanchadas with actors like Wilson Gray, Wilson Viana, Zé Trindade and so many others of that generation. Sometimes he was a bandit (De Pernas pro Ar) or even a newspaper photographer (É de Chuá!).

With the arrival of more ambitious and supposedly intellectual cinematic movements of Glauber Rocha and its pairs, the space of comedians originating from the chanchada went to the television. Comedians such as Oscarito, Grande Otelo, and Ankito were without the cinema and without the stardom of before. In the 1960s, very few comedies or popular films were made in Brazil compared to the previous decade. An exception is a cycle of crime and Nazi exploitation films. In the case of Costinha, he went to television premiering on TV Excelsior.

In the 1970s the cinema is popular again and brings the old comedians back to the screens. Costinha returns acting in urban films (Como Ganhar na Loteria sem Perder a Esportiva), homages to the chanchada (Salário Mínimo), films about the youth (Amor em Quatro Tempos – História 1) or even pornochanchadas (Histórias Que Nossas Babás não Contavam). He also began to be the protagonist of films, as in O Libertino, O Homem de Seis Milhões de Cruzeiros contra as Panteras, Costinha, o Rei da Selva, Costinha e o King Mong, and As Aventuras de Robinson Crusoé.

He has performed in several plays and TV shows, such as Apertura on Rede Tupi, Aperte o Cinto and Domingo de Graça on Rede Manchete, Costinha em 3 Atos e ½ on SBT, Planeta dos Homens, Os Trapalhões, and Chico Anysio Show on Rede Globo. His last role was as "Seu Mazarito" (a homage to Mazzaropi and Oscarito) in the Escolinha do Professor Raimundo TV show.

On 4 September 1995, Costinha was admitted to the Pan-Americano Hospital, in Rio de Janeiro, with shortness of breath, and died on the 15th of the same month at 72 years of age of pulmonary emphysema. He was buried in the Cemitério de São João Batista, in Rio de Janeiro. He was first married to Irani Pereira da Costa, with whom he had four natural daughters, and was secondly married with Amor Laurette Guzzardi, with whom he had three stepchildren.

Works

Discography 
 Humorismo (Anedotas) (1971)
 O Peru da Festa vol. 1 (1981)
 O Peru da Festa vol. 2 (1982)
 O Peru da Festa vol. 3 (1983)
 As Proibidas do Costinha (1988)
 Costinha vol. 5: O Mazarito da Escolhinha (1991)

Theatrical performances

Filmography

Television

Film

Books

References

Bibliography

External links 
 

1923 births
1995 deaths
Actors from Rio de Janeiro (state)